M. Yasin Çakmak (born January 6, 1985, in Rize, Turkey) is a Turkish former football player.

Club career
On August 3, 2007, Yasin completed his move to Fenerbahçe S.K. July 8, 2009, Yasin Çakmak was sent To Sivasspor in exchange for Fabio Bilica and €2 million.

During his spell at Giresunspor, Çakmak picked up a long time injury in 2014. In 2015, Çakmak retired from professional football at the age of 30.

International career
Yasin was called up to the Turkey national football team for EURO 2008 qualifiers in March 2007. His first cap came on April 12, 2006, against Azerbaijan.

References

External links
Player Profile at TFF.org 
 

1985 births
Living people
Turkish footballers
Turkey international footballers
Turkey under-21 international footballers
Çaykur Rizespor footballers
Fenerbahçe S.K. footballers
Sivasspor footballers
Denizlispor footballers
Giresunspor footballers
Tokatspor footballers
Süper Lig players
Turkey youth international footballers
Association football defenders
Sportspeople from Rize